The Bhrigu Superfast Express is a Superfast train belonging to Northern Railway Zone that runs between  and  in India. It is currently being operated with 22427/22428 Train numbers on a weekly basis.

The train is named after Bhrigu who was one of the seven great sages, the Saptarishi, one of the many Prajapatis created by Brahma.

Service 
The 22427/04049 Bhrigu Superfast Express has an average speed of 62 km/hr and covers 886 km in 14h 15m. The 22428/04050 Bhrigu Superfast Express has an average speed of 63 km/hr and covers 886 km in 14h 10m.

Route and halts 

The important halts of the train are :

Coach composition

The train has LHB rakes with max speed of 130 kmph. The train consists of 21 coaches:

 1 AC II Tier
 4 AC III Tier
 9 Sleeper coaches
 5 General Unreserved
 1 Sitting Cum Liggage Car
 1 Generator Power Car

Traction

It is hauled by a Ghaziabad based WAP-7 locomotive from Ballia to Anand Vihar Terminal and vice versa.

See also 

 Ballia railway station
 Anand Vihar Terminal railway station

References

Notes

External links 

 22427/Bhrigu Superfast Express
 22428/Bhrigu Superfast Express

Rail transport in Delhi
Rail transport in Uttar Pradesh
Transport in Delhi
Express trains in India
Railway services introduced in 2016
Named passenger trains of India
Ballia